The rufous-tailed fantail (Rhipidura phoenicura) is a species of bird in the family Rhipiduridae. It is endemic to Java in Indonesia. Its natural habitat is subtropical or tropical moist montane forests.

References

rufous-tailed fantail
Birds of Java
rufous-tailed fantail
Taxonomy articles created by Polbot